Palm Canyon Wash is an arroyo and tributary ephemeral stream or wash running east from the Jacumba Mountains in San Diego County, California to its confluence with Coyote Wash, east northeast of Ocotillo in the Yuha Desert of Imperial County, California at an elevation of .

References

Coyote Wash (California)
Geography of the Colorado Desert
Rivers of Southern California